Bhavnagar railway division is one of the six railway divisions under Western Railway zone of Indian Railways. This railway division was formed on 5 November 1951 and its headquarter is located at Bhavnagar in the state of Gujarat of India.

Mumbai WR railway division, Ahmedabad railway division, Vadodara railway division, Rajkot railway division and Ratlam railway division are the other five railway divisions under WR Zone headquartered at Churchgate, Mumbai.

List of railway stations and towns 
The list includes the stations under the Bhavnagar railway division and their station category.

Stations closed for Passengers -

References

 
Divisions of Indian Railways
1951 establishments in Bombay State